Courage Under Fire (1 August 1995 – 29 July 2017) was a New Zealand-bred champion Standardbred race horse notable for being undefeated in his first 24 race starts. A diminutive horse, he was known as Mighty Mouse.

Racing
Courage Under Fire was undefeated in both his two- and three-year-old seasons of racing. As a three-year-old he won a record six derbies. In the Australian Derby at Moonee Valley he broke the track record defeating local star Shakamaker.

As an older horse Courage Under Fire was defeated for the first time in a heat of the 2000 Inter Dominion Pacing Championship after winning his first 24 races. After the 2000 Inter Dominion he was relocated from the New Zealand stables of Bruce Negus to Australian trainer Brian Hancock however his career plateaued. He later won the South Australian Cup, Queensland Pacing Championship and Australian Pacing Championship. He was narrowly beaten in the Miracle Mile and Victoria Cup and he won six heats of the Inter Dominion Pacing Championship and was fourth in the final in 2001. In the South Australian Cup at Globe Derby Park in 2001 he set a track record that stood until broken by his son Smolda in 2017. A popular horse, large crowds often surrounded his stall for a glimpse.

Courage Under Fire won 41 of 56 starts and earned $NZ1,551,941 in stakes.

Stud career

At stud he sired more than 400 winners in New Zealand and more than 300 winners in Australia including Inter Dominion Pacing Championship winner Smolda and was expected to serve a full book of mares in the 2017–18 breeding season.

He died at Yirribee Stud near Wagga Wagga, New South Wales after being purchased by Yirribee in July 2017.

See also

 Harness racing in Australia
 Harness racing in New Zealand

References

Standardbred racehorses bred in New Zealand
Racehorses trained in New Zealand
Racehorses trained in Australia